Sindhi High School is an educational institution in Kempapura near Hebbal, situated in the city of Bangalore, India. Sindhi High School is run by the Sindhi Seva Samiti.It follows CBSE Syllabus.It is ranked among the top 10 CBSE schools in Bangalore.

History 
Sindhi Seva Samithi extended its vision of providing education at an affordable price by starting a school at Hebbal. This school was started on 9 June 2003 with a strength of 1165 pupils.

See also 
 Vidyashilp Academy
 Trio World Academy
 Mallya Aditi International School

References

High schools and secondary schools in Bangalore